West Hall High School is a public high school located in the western portion of Hall County, Georgia, United States, in the foothills of the Appalachian Mountains.  West Hall is located about 10 miles southwest of Gainesville City, 20 miles Southwest of Dahlonega, and around 40 miles northeast of Downtown Atlanta.

Administration
Ley Hathcock - Principal
David Wagner - Assistant Principal, Athletic Director
Ean Sonnier - Assistant Principal, CTAE Director
Anna Jackson- Assistant Principal, Curriculum Director

Demographics
Hispanic- 46.3%
White/Caucasian - 43.8%
Black - 5.3%
Asian - 2.4%
Other - 2.2%

International Baccalaureate
In 2008, West Hall High School established a World School for the International Baccalaureate program. The program is currently presided over by Mrs. Julie Pritchard and offers candidacies in the Diploma Programme and Career-related Programme, as well as coursework necessary for earning the Bilingual Diploma.

Athletics

West Hall Football

Coaching Staff

 Krofton "Monty" Montgomery - Head Coach
  - Offensive Coordinator- Matt Riden- O Line 
  - Defensive Coordinator - Jimbo Hale - Linebackers
  - Special Teams and Assistant Head Coach - John Thompson_
 Timothy "Tim" Doster - Running Backs
 Benjamin "Larry" Parnell -Quarterbacks and Offensive Pass Game Coordinator 
 Steve Johnson- Running Backs- Run Game Coordinator
 Josh Taylor - Offensive Line-
 Trevor Catrett - Community Relations Coordinator

www.westhallfootball.org

Achievements

 State Playoffs
 1995
 2000
 2001
 2002
 2013
 2014
 2015
 2016
 2017
 Region 7-AAA Champions
 2014

Arts
 Band
 Chorus
 Drama
 Photography
 Visual arts

Major awards

 1994 - One-Act Play State Champions
 1996 - One-Act Play State Champions
 2011 - One-Act Play State Champions
 2012 - One-Act Play State Runner-Up
 2014 - 7AAA Football Region Champions
 2015 - 7AAA Boys soccer Region Champions
 2015 - AAA Boys Soccer State Champions
 2016 - One-Act Play State Runner Up

Notable alumni

 
 {Hunter Atkinson}- Former professional football player (Atlanta Falcons)
 Martrez Milner - former professional football player, Atlanta Falcons

References

External links 
Official website

Educational institutions established in 1972
Schools in Hall County, Georgia
Public high schools in Georgia (U.S. state)
International Baccalaureate schools in Georgia (U.S. state)